Duško Đurišić (Cyrillic: Душко Ђуришић; born 20 December 1977) is a Montenegrin former professional footballer who played as a defender.

Club career
After spending seven years at OFK Beograd, Đurišić moved abroad to Switzerland and joined Sion in early 2001. He spent one year at the club, before transferring to French side Sedan in the 2002 winter transfer window. In the following period, Đurišić also played for Lokeren, Hapoel Petah Tikva, and SC Paderborn.

In the summer of 2008, Đurišić signed with Cypriot club Apollon Limassol. He spent one season there, scoring twice in 22 league appearances. In January 2010, Đurišić returned to Serbia to play for Vojvodina. He eventually retired at the end of the 2009–10 season.

Personal life
Đurišić is married to Vesna Čitaković, a Serbian former professional volleyball player. Their son, Nikola Đurišić, is a basketball player.

References

External links
 
 
 
 
 

1977 births
Living people
People from Bar, Montenegro
Association football defenders
Serbia and Montenegro footballers
Montenegrin footballers
OFK Beograd players
FC Sion players
CS Sedan Ardennes players
K.S.C. Lokeren Oost-Vlaanderen players
Hapoel Petah Tikva F.C. players
SC Paderborn 07 players
Apollon Limassol FC players
FK Vojvodina players
First League of Serbia and Montenegro players
Swiss Super League players
Ligue 1 players
Ligue 2 players
Belgian Pro League players
Israeli Premier League players
2. Bundesliga players
Cypriot First Division players
Serbian SuperLiga players
Serbia and Montenegro expatriate footballers
Expatriate footballers in Switzerland
Serbia and Montenegro expatriate sportspeople in Switzerland
Expatriate footballers in France
Serbia and Montenegro expatriate sportspeople in France
Expatriate footballers in Belgium
Serbia and Montenegro expatriate sportspeople in Belgium
Expatriate footballers in Israel
Serbia and Montenegro expatriate sportspeople in Israel
Montenegrin expatriate footballers
Expatriate footballers in Germany
Montenegrin expatriate sportspeople in Germany
Expatriate footballers in Cyprus
Montenegrin expatriate sportspeople in Cyprus
Expatriate footballers in Serbia
Montenegrin expatriate sportspeople in Serbia